Josiah Hayden Drummond (August 20, 1827 – October 25, 1902) was an American attorney and politician. He served as Maine Attorney General from 1860 to 1863.

Personal
J.H. Drummond was born to Clark and Cynthia (Blackwell) Drummond in Winslow, Maine. He attended Vassalboro Academy and graduated from Colby College in 1846. He married Elzada Rollins (Bean) on December 10, 1850, and had three daughters and one son.

Career

He entered politics as a Democrat, but when the Republican Party was formed he joined it. He was a Maine State Representative from Waterville in 1857 - 1858, and Speaker of the Maine House of Representatives in 1858.  He was a State Senator in 1859, and resigned his seat to accept the position of Maine Attorney General, which he held from 1860 - 1863.  He was again a Maine State Congressman and Speaker of the House in 1868.

He held numerous positions as a Freemason: Grand Master of the Grand Lodge of Maine from 1860-1862; in the Scottish Rite, Northern Jurisdiction, he was a Lieutenant Grand Commander from 1862 - 1863 and Sovereign Grand Commander from 1867-1878; and General Grand Master of the General Grand Council of Royal and Select Masters from 1880-1882.

He was the Chairman of the Board of Trustees at Colby College from 1890-1902.

With his son he formed Drummond & Drummond law firm in 1881 which continues to the present day in downtown Portland, Maine, as one of the oldest firms in the state.

Published works

Further reading

References

External links

1827 births
1902 deaths
Colby College alumni
Maine Attorneys General
Politicians from Waterville, Maine
People from Winslow, Maine
Speakers of the Maine House of Representatives
Maine state senators
19th-century American politicians
Maine Democrats
Maine Republicans